Maanasaandarapetta Yezdi is a 2016 Indian Malayalam comedy movie, produced and directed by debutant Arun Omana Sadanandan under the banner of Water Farm. The film stars P. Balachandran and Jayan Cherthala in the lead roles along with Indrans, Appunni Sasi and Sivadas Mattannur. The movie was shot in Chembukadavu village in Kozhikode.

Plot
Pappi is a well known mechanic. Pappi's elder brother Chethanappi runs another workshop. Brothers always quarrel with each other. Fed up with their fights, villagers decided that they settle their quarrels with bike race. Their favorite Yezdi bike which was used for the races come to the possession of Philipose. The comic turn of events that take place after this is the theme of the movie.

Cast
 P. Balachandran as Chethanappi
 Jayan Cherthala as Pappi
 Indrans as Philipose
 Aneesha Ummer as Seetha
 Appunni Sasi
 Sivadas Mattannur
 James Eliya
 Sasi Iranjikkal
 John Joseph
 Naveen Kunjumon
 Nazrudeen Valiyaveettil
 Sinseer as Mukkali

References

External links 
 
 Official Trailer YouTube

2016 films
2010s Malayalam-language films
Films shot in Kozhikode